Huantai County is a county of Zibo City in north-central Shandong province, People's Republic of China.

The population in 1999 was 482,683.

Administrative divisions
As 2012, this County is divided to 11 towns.
Towns

Climate

References 

 
Counties of Shandong
Zibo